The Evangelical People's Party of Switzerland, Swiss Evangelical Party, or Evangelical Party of Switzerland is a Protestant Christian-democratic political party in Switzerland, active mainly in the Cantons of Bern, Basel-Land, Basel-Stadt, Aargau and Zürich. "Evangelical" translates as evangelisch, the German term for "Protestant", as opposed to "evangelical" as used in Anglo-Saxon Christianity.

The EVP is conservative on euthanasia, abortion, registered partnerships and other typically Christian issues, centrist on economic issues and stands rather centre-left on issues of wealth redistribution, education, environmentalism and immigration. Among other things, it claims to be "dedicated to protecting the environment out of a sense of responsibility for  Creation" and states that "the ethical values of the Bible should be the foundation of society."

The EVP is a member of the European Christian Political Movement (EPCM) and was previously an observer member of the European People's Party (EPP) until 2008. In the Federal Assembly of Switzerland the EVP forms a joint group along with the Christian Democratic People's Party (CVP) and the Christian Social Party of Obwalden (CSP OW).

In February 2023, in a shock result, Thomi Jourdan of Basel-Landschaft's EVP – which has a voter base of less than 4 % in that canton – was elected into the state government, and will join four centrist-leftist-green colleagues. He is the first EVP government member on the state or federal level in Swiss history. This was due to a very active campaign from his side, and a lackluster one of his SVP opponent, national councillor Sandra Sollberger, who only appealed to right-wing voters. She also cited a lack of time which prevented her from campaigning properly.

References

External links
 
English version of introductory page

1919 establishments in Switzerland
Political parties established in 1919
Political parties in Switzerland
Protestant political parties
European Christian Political Movement
Conservative parties in Switzerland